Lake Agnococha (possibly from Quechua aknu beautiful, qucha lake) is a lake in Peru located in the Huancavelica Region, Castrovirreyna Province, Santa Ana District. Agnococha lies north of a larger lake named Orcococha.

The Agnococha dam was erected in 1957.

References 

Lakes of Peru
Lakes of Huancavelica Region
Dams in Peru
Buildings and structures in Huancavelica Region